The  is a train service operated on the Tōhoku Shinkansen by East Japan Railway Company (JR East) in Japan.

Origin

Operations
Nasuno services stop at all stations en route. 
Double-decker Nasuno services formed of E4 series sets also operated up until September 2012, named Max Nasuno.

Rolling stock
 E2 series (since March 1997)
 E3 series
 E5 series (since November 2011)
 E6 series (since 16 March 2013)
 H5 series (since 26 March 2016)

Former rolling stock
 200 series (June 1982 – November 2011)
 E1 series (Max Nasuno) (July 1994 – December 1999)
 E4 series (Max Nasuno) (until 28 September 2012)

History

On 10 December 1995, the name was adopted for the new all-stations services on the Tōhoku Shinkansen. The Tōhoku Main Line services to and from Shinjuku were renamed Ohayō Tochigi and Hometown Tochigi from this date. Prior to 1995, Aoba services formed the all-stations services along the whole line. However, with the introduction of short-distance Nasuno services, Aoba services were reduced, and in 1997, discontinued altogether, with the local services covered by Nasuno as far as Kōriyama, and all further stations served by the Yamabiko.

See also
 List of named passenger trains of Japan

References

External links

 E2 series Hayate/Yamabiko/Nasuno 

Tōhoku Shinkansen
Railway services introduced in 1959
Named Shinkansen trains